Glycerol-3-phosphate dehydrogenase may refer to:

 Glycerol-3-phosphate dehydrogenase, an enzyme (EC 1.1.1.8) with systematic name sn-glycerol-3-phosphate:NAD+ 2-oxidoreductase
 Glycerol-3-phosphate dehydrogenase (NAD(P)+), an enzyme (EC 1.1.1.94) with systematic name sn-glycerol-3-phosphate:NAD(P)+ 2-oxidoreductase
 Glycerol-3-phosphate dehydrogenase (quinone), an enzyme (EC 1.1.5.3) with systematic name sn-glycerol 3-phosphate:quinone oxidoreductase